Remzi Giray Kaçar (born 15 March 1985 in Karaman, Turkey) is a former Turkish footballer.

Career
Giray Kaçar previously played for Gençlerbirliği at the youth level, before transferring to Trabzonspor in 2008.

He was called up to the national team on 6 February 2008, for a match against Sweden. He has also played 4 times for the U21 national team.

Honours
Trabzonspor
Turkish Cup: 2009–10
Turkish Super Cup: 2010

References

External links
Profile at TFF.org
 

1985 births
Living people
Turkish footballers
Turkey international footballers
Trabzonspor footballers
Süper Lig players
Turkey under-21 international footballers
Association football central defenders
People from Karaman

Association football defenders